Scirtoidea is a superfamily of beetles. It is traditionally considered to consist of four families: Clambidae, Decliniidae, Eucinetidae and Scirtidae. However, genetic studies have suggested that Clambidae and Eucinetidae belong to a separate superfamily Clamboidea, which also includes Derodontidae. Scirtoidea and Clamboidea are the two earliest diverging lineages of living polyphagans.

Two extinct families have also been assigned to this group:
† Mesocinetidae Kirejtshuk and Ponomarenko 2010 Late Jurassic-Early Cretaceous (Asia)
† Elodophthalmidae Kirejtshuk and Azar 2008 monotypic, Lebanese amber, Barremian

References

External links 
 Tree of Life

 
Beetle superfamilies